As of August 2019, Yakutia Airlines operates flights to the following:

References

Lists of airline destinations
Russia transport-related lists